Reading West may refer to:

Reading West (UK Parliament constituency), a constituency represented in the House of Commons of the Parliament of the United Kingdom 
Reading West railway station, a railway station in West Reading, Berkshire, England

See also
 West Reading (disambiguation)